Staphylococcus microti is a Gram-positive, coagulase-negative member of the bacterial genus Staphylococcus consisting of clustered cocci. This species was originally isolated from viscera of the common vole, Microtus arvalis.  It is genetically similar to Staphylococcus rostri.

References

External links
Type strain of Staphylococcus microti at BacDive -  the Bacterial Diversity Metadatabase

microti
Bacteria described in 2010